The crystal siltsnail, also known as the helicoid spring snail, scientific name Floridobia helicogyra,  is a species of small freshwater snail with a gill and an operculum,  an aquatic gastropod mollusk in the family Hydrobiidae.

This species is endemic to the United States.  Its natural habitat is rivers. It is threatened by habitat loss.

References

Molluscs of the United States
Floridobia
Hydrobiidae
Gastropods described in 1968
Taxonomy articles created by Polbot